The 1991 Open Clarins was a women's tennis tournament played on outdoor clay courts at the Racing Club de France in Paris, France, and was part of the Tier IV category of the 1991 WTA Tour. It was the fifth edition of the tournament and was held from 16 September until 22 September 1991. First-seeded Conchita Martínez won her second consecutive singles title at the event and earned $27,000 first-prize money.

Finals

Singles
 Conchita Martínez defeated  Inés Gorrochategui 6–0, 6–3
 It was Martínez' 3rd singles title of the year and the 10th of her career.

Doubles
 Petra Langrová /  Helena Suková defeated  Alexia Dechaume /  Julie Halard 6–4, 6–4

References

External links
 ITF tournament edition details
 Tournament draws

Open Clarins
Clarins Open
1991 in Paris
1991 in French tennis